The men's 84 kg (184.8 lbs) Semi-Contact category at the W.A.K.O. World Championships 2007 in Coimbra was the fourth heaviest of the male Semi-Contact tournaments falling between the light heavyweight and cruiserweight division when compared to Full-Contact's weight classes. There were eighteen fighters from four continents (Europe, North America, South America and Oceania) taking part in the competition. Each of the matches was three rounds of two minutes each and were fought under Semi-Contact rules.

Due to the less than required numbers for a thirty-two man event, fourteen of the fighters had a bye through to the second round. The tournament winner was the Canadian Jason Grenier who won gold by defeating the Greek Andreas Aggelopoulos in the final match. Germany's Robert Knoedlseder and Croatian Zvonimir Gribl won bronze medals for reaching the semi finals.

Results

Key

See also 
 List of WAKO Amateur World Championships
 List of WAKO Amateur European Championships
 List of male kickboxers

References

External links 
 WAKO World Association of Kickboxing Organizations Official Site

Kickboxing events at the WAKO World Championships 2007 Coimbra
2007 in kickboxing
Kickboxing in Portugal